Jus exclusivae (Latin for "right of exclusion"; sometimes called the papal veto) was the right claimed by several Catholic monarchs of Europe to veto a candidate for the papacy. Although never formally recognized by the Catholic Church, the monarchs of France, Spain and Austria claimed this right at various times, making known to a papal conclave, through a crown-cardinal, that the monarch deemed a particular candidate for the papacy objectionable.

Early history 
The right exercised by Byzantine and Holy Roman emperors to confirm the election of a pope, which was last exercised in the Early Middle Ages, appears unrelated to the early modern legal claim of jus exclusivae by the Holy Roman Empire, France, and Spain. Pope Pius IV, in his bull In Elgidendis (1562), excluded formal support of the Church to such rights and external interventions in the conclave. It was explicitly forbidden in 1904 with the bull Commissum Nobis of Pope Pius X.
 
In the 17th century, treatises in defence of this right first appear. It was notably invoked in 1644 by both Spain and France. Spain used it to exclude the election of Giulio Cesare Sacchetti, whereas France failed to veto the election of Giovanni Battista Pamphili (who became Pope Innocent X).

Right asserted since 1644 
 1644 Papal conclave – Giulio Cesare Sacchetti, by King Philip IV of Spain
 1655 Papal conclave – Giulio Cesare Sacchetti, by King Philip IV of Spain
 1669–70 Papal conclave – Benedetto Odescalchi, by King Louis XIV of France
 1700 Papal conclave – Galeazzo Marescotti, by King Louis XIV of France
 1721 Papal conclave – Fabrizio Paolucci, by Emperor Charles VI; and Francesco Pignatelli by Philip V of Spain
 1721 Papal conclave – Francesco Pignatelli, by King Philip V of Spain
 1730 Papal conclave – Giuseppe Renato Imperiali, by King Philip V of Spain
 1758 Papal conclave – Carlo Alberto Guidoboni Cavalchini, by King Louis XV of France
 1774–75 Papal conclave - Giovanni Carlo Boschi, by the Bourbon courts
 1823 Papal conclave –  by Emperor Francis I of Austria
 1830–31 Papal conclave – Giacomo Giustiniani, by King Ferdinand VII of Spain
 1903 Papal conclave – Mariano Rampolla, by Emperor Franz Joseph I of Austria

At the 1846 Papal conclave, Austrian Chancellor Klemens von Metternich confided Austria's veto of Cardinal Giovanni Maria Mastai-Ferretti to Cardinal Carlo Gaetano Gaisruck, Archbishop of Milan, who arrived too late. Mastai-Ferretti would reign as Pius IX for over thirty-one years.

Papal attitude toward the jus exclusivae 

The right has never been formally recognized by the papacy, though conclaves have considered it expedient to recognize secular objections to certain papabili, that is, candidates for the papacy, and to accept secular interference as an unavoidable abuse. By the papal bull In eligendis of 9 October 1562 Pope Pius IV ordered the cardinals to elect a pope without deference to any secular power. The bull Aeterni Patris Filius by Pope Gregory XV (15 November 1621) forbids cardinals to conspire to exclude any candidate. These pronouncements however, did not specifically condemn the jus exclusivae. In the apostolic constitution In hac sublimi of 23 August 1871 Pope Pius IX forbade any kind of secular interference in papal elections.

The most recent attempt to exercise the right to exclude Cardinal Rampolla in 1903 was rejected by the conclave, although over the course of several ballots Rampolla, who had been the leading candidate, lost support until the conclave elected Cardinal Sarto, Saint Pius X. The following year, Pius X forbade the jus exclusivae in the apostolic constitution Commissum Nobis of 20 January 1904:

Since then the cardinals in conclave have been enjoined to take this oath: "We shall never in any way accept, under any pretext, from any civil power whatever, the office of proposing a veto of exclusion even under the form of a mere desire… and we shall never lend favour to any intervention, or intercession, or any other method whatever, by which the lay powers of any grade or order may wish to interfere in the election of a pontiff."

No power has openly attempted to exercise the right since 1903. France had become a republic in 1870. After World War I, the German Empire and the Austro-Hungarian Empire were abolished. Spain became a republic and eventually a constitutional monarchy. During the 1963 conclave, Generalissimo Francisco Franco made an unsuccessful attempt to block the election of Cardinal Giovanni Montini. He sent the College of Cardinals some "advice" through Cardinal Arcadio Larraona, a native of Spain who was then the Prefect of the Congregation of Rites. It was carefully drafted to fall outside the forms of influence that Pius X had prohibited, but the cardinals nevertheless thought it outrageous.

See also 
 Papal appointment

Notes

References

Sources 
 Catholic Encyclopedia, Right of Exclusion. (article by Johannes Baptist Sägmüller, 1909). 
 .
 Ludwig Wahrmund, Das Ausschliessungs-recht (jus exclusivae) der katholischen Staaten Österreich, Frankreich und Spanien bei den Papstwahlen (Wien: Holder 1888).
 Ludwig Wahrmund, "Beiträge zur Geschichte des Exclusionsrechtes bei den Papstwahlen aus römischen Archiven," Sitzungsberichte der Kaiserliche Akademie der Wissenschaften in Wien, philosophisch-historische Klasse, Band CCXXII, xiii (Wien 1890).
 J. B. Sägmüller, Die Papstwahlbullen und das staatliche Recht der Exklusive (Tuebingen: H. Laupp 1892).
 Ludwig Wahrmund, "Die Bulle "Aeterni Patris Filius" und der staatliche Einfluss auf die Papstwahlen," Archiv für katholisches Kirchenrecht 72 (Mainz 1894) 201-334.
 Ludwig Wahrmund, Zur Geschiste des exclusionrechtes bei den Papstwahlen im 18 Jahrhundert. Neue Beitrage aus römischen Archiven (Mainz 1892).
 William J. Hegarty, "The Lay Veto," American Catholic Quarterly Review 37 (1912), pp. 419–439.
 Herbert Plock, Das "Jus exclusivae" der Staaten bei der Papstwahl und sein Verbotdurch die päpstliche Bulle "Commissum nobis" (Göttingen: Druck von L. Hofer, 1910).
 Peter Frei, Die Papstwahl des Jahres 1903: unter besonderer Berücksichtigung des österreichisch-ungarischen Vetos (Bern and Frankfurt a.M.: Peter Lang, 1977).

Veto
History of the papacy
Election of the Pope
Catholic Church legal terminology
Latin legal terminology
Religion and politics
Separation of church and state
Right of presentation